The Governor General's Award for French-language fiction is a Canadian literary award that annually recognizes one Canadian writer for a fiction book written in French. It is one of fourteen Governor General's Awards for Literary Merit, seven each for creators of English- and French-language books. The Governor General's Awards program is administered by the Canada Council for the Arts.

The program was created and inaugurated in 1937, for 1936 publications in two categories, conventionally called the 1936 awards. French-language works were first recognized by the 1959 Governor General's Awards. Prior to 1959, the Canada Council did not present any awards for French-language literature, although four works originally published in French — Ringuet's Thirty Acres, Germaine Guèvremont's The Outlander, and Gabrielle Roy's The Tin Flute and Street of Riches — won the Governor General's Award for English-language fiction when a follow-up English translation was published.

The winners alone were announced until 1979, when Canada Council released in advance a shortlist of three nominees. Since then, the advance shortlist has numbered three to six; from 2002, always five.

Winners and nominees

1950s

1960s

1970s

1980s

1990s

2000s

2010s

2020s

References 

Canadian fiction awards

Awards established in 1959
1959 establishments in Canada
Fiction
French-language literary awards